Michael Richard Bennett (born 27 August 1969) is an English former professional footballer who played as a winger. During his career, he made over 150 appearances in the Football League. Since his retirement from playing, Bennett has become involved with helping footballers dealing with depression and is currently the head of player welfare at the Professional Footballers' Association.

Career
Bennett had represented England at youth level, including being included in an England under-20 tour of Brazil, but his career was disrupted by a serious knee injury sustained in a match against Queens Park Rangers in 1991 while playing for Charlton Athletic. He was originally told that he would be out for six weeks but was kept out of the game for nine months when it was revealed he had ruptured his anterior cruciate ligament and crushed the cartilage in his knee. Bennett has admitted that, although he returned to league football, he never recovered from the injury, largely due to the mental stress it caused and retired from football at the age of 29.

Bennett set up an organization called Unique Sports Counselling to help footballers deal with mental health issues.

Honours
Canvey Island
FA Trophy: 2000–01

References

External links

1969 births
Living people
Footballers from Camberwell
English footballers
Association football midfielders
Charlton Athletic F.C. players
Wimbledon F.C. players
Millwall F.C. players
Brentford F.C. players
Cardiff City F.C. players
Cambridge City F.C. players
Leyton Orient F.C. players
Brighton & Hove Albion F.C. players
Canvey Island F.C. players
English Football League players